Ken Turner may refer to:

Ken Turner (Australian footballer) (born 1935), former Australian rules footballer
Ken Turner (Australian politician) (born 1944), former Australian politician
Ken Turner (baseball) (born 1943), former Major League Baseball pitcher
Ken Turner (director), British television and film director and screenwriter
Ken Turner (English footballer) (born 1941), English former footballer
Ken Turner (New Zealand politician), New Zealand politician and councillor on the Auckland Council
Kenneth Turner (1928–2018), Australian academic